The contrabass trombone is the lowest-pitched instrument in the trombone family of brass instruments. First appearing built in 18′ B♭ an octave below the tenor trombone, since the late 20th century it has largely been supplanted by a less cumbersome bass-contrabass instrument pitched in 12′ F, a perfect fourth below the tenor and bass trombones. Wagner notably specified the contrabass for his Der Ring des Nibelungen opera cycle in the 1870s, and it has since appeared occasionally in large orchestral works without becoming a permanent member of the modern orchestra. In the 21st century it has enjoyed something of a revival, particularly in film and video game soundtracks.

History 

The bass trombones of the time were pitched in 12′ F, or 14′ E♭. During this period, the contrabass trombone was built with a very long slide, with an extension handle to reach the lower positions. This instrument was seldom used and generally unsatisfactory with players, being unwieldy and taxing to play.

The innovation that enabled a practical instrument was the double slide, first documented nearly two centuries later in 1816 by Gottfried Weber. He proposed that it would lend greater facility to the bass trombone, and described the idea of using two joined outer slides moving on four inner tubes, halving the distances between slide positions. Makers soon applied the double slide to bass trombones in F and E♭ that would normally require a slide handle to reach the longest positions. Newly invented models of contrabass trombone in low 16′ C and 18′ B♭ soon followed, and the first double-slide contrabass trombones were produced by Parisian maker Jean Hilaire Asté (Halary) in the 1830s.

First use in orchestral music 

In France, Bizet called for contrabass trombone in his opera La Coutes du Roi de Thulé (1869), and in his completion of Halévy's unfinished opera Noé in the same year. Soon after, Wagner notably employed contrabass trombone in his four opera cycle Der Ring des Nibelungen, writing a fourth trombone part to double on bass and contrabass trombone. For the première performances in 1876, Wagner commissioned a contrabass in 18′ B♭ from Berlin instrument maker Carl Wilhelm Moritz, who built it with a double slide. The double slide and the pitch one octave lower means this instrument has the same seven positions as the tenor trombone, and a range to the low E in the “spear” motif in Das Rheingold:

In Britain in the 1860s London instrument maker Boosey & Co. built a small number of “Basso Profundo” double-slide contrabass trombones in 16′ C. These were intended for use in British orchestras performing Wagner's operas, and one surviving instrument built in 1898 was named “King Kong” by players. In America at the turn of the 20th century, Conn manufactured a small number of B♭ double slide contrabass trombones, of which three are known to survive.

19th century Italy 

Italian composers for much of the 19th century specified the cimbasso as the bass voice of the brass section, a confusing term which over time referred to an upright serpent, ophicleide, or early variants of the tuba. In preparation for the La Scala première of Aida in 1872, Verdi expressed his displeasure about "that devilish bombardone" (referring to the tuba) as the bass of the trombone section, preferring a "trombone basso". This instrument blended with the usual Italian trombone section of the time—three tenor valve trombones in B♭—and became the prototype for the modern cimbasso. Verdi and Puccini both wrote for this instrument in their later operas, although confusingly they often referred to it as simply  to distinguish it from the tenor trombones.

Later innovations 

In 1921, Ernst Dehmel, a Berlin trombonist, patented a new design of contrabass trombone that added two independent rotary valves to the old bass trombone in F, still found in Prussian military bands of the time. The valves provide a fully chromatic range by supplying missing low register notes between the first partial pedal F in first position and the second partial C in sixth (slide fully extended, without using a handle). The valves also provide alternatives for other notes in long slide positions, thus neither a longer slide with a handle nor a cumbersome double slide are needed. Dehmel's bass-contrabass instrument is the prototype for all modern F contrabass trombone designs.

Contemporary use 

Since the late 20th century the contrabass trombone in F with two valve attachments has all but replaced the double slide B♭ instrument.
The contrabass trombone is increasingly called for in large orchestral works by modern composers, and routinely since the late 1990s in film and video game soundtracks.

Construction 

Instruments in F today are built with two independent (“in-line”) valves. These valves are usually arranged in two ways. A “traditional” configuration, common with European manufacturers, has valves in D and B♭, which combine to lower the instrument to A♭. The advantage of the resulting F/D/B♭/A♭ instrument is that the slide positions on the D valve are already familiar to bass trombonists using B♭/F/D instruments, and the B♭ valve is an octave below the bass trombone. The “American” style, commonly used by American manufacturers and players, has valves in C and D♭, combining to give A. This gives a contrabass in F/C/D♭/A, an arrangement familiar to bass trombonists used to the bass trombone in B♭/F/G♭/D, since the valves lower the pitch by the same intervals and provide familiar slide position patterns. Although known as the “American” tuning due to its popularisation by Californian maker Kanstul in the 2000s, German maker Lätzsch was building instruments with this configuration in the 1980s. Some instrument makers provide sets of tuning slides that allow changing between both configurations.

Some models employ a dual-bore slide, and many models are now made using Axial or Hagmann valves.

Double slide instruments 

Double slide contrabass trombones are still made by Thein and Miraphone, in 18′ B♭ (Miraphone also offer one built in 16′ C). They are all built with at least one valve that lowers the instrument a forth (i.e. B♭/F or C/G), and the Miraphone C model has two independent valves, in G and the second tunable to A or A♭. The second valve can also be fitted with a smaller B♭ tuning slide and has a reversible linkage to place the instrument in B♭, raising it to C when engaged.

The double slide can be conceived of as two regular trombone slides operating as one, i.e. two outer slide bows braced together, moving on four parallel inner slides. Although it eliminates the need for a long slide with a handle, it doubles the weight, the friction of movement, and the length of the air column that must be strictly cylindrical.

Older double slide instruments from the 19th and early 20th centuries (Conn, Boosey & Co. and others) were built with narrower bores and did not have valve attachments, and some instruments only have six usable slide positions, instead of the seven that would be expected.

Range 

The range of a modern F contrabass trombone with two valves is fully chromatic from at least C to F, with a comfortable working range of approximately E to D. Pedal tones (fundamentals) on most instruments tend to be distinct and resonant, and can be obtained to C with the six reachable open slide positions, and further to F♯ using the valves. Players of uncommon instruments with only one valve (usually in C) will find the low G above the first F pedal difficult or impossible to reach. F♯ is unobtainable without a second valve. Some mid-20th century instruments were built with a longer slide with a handle to reach longer positions, but these are rarely encountered outside Germany.

The range of the original B♭ contrabass trombone demanded by Wagner was from E to E, but composers have since required even lower notes, as low as B♭. While pedal tones can in theory be obtained down to E in seventh position (and to C using a valve), in practice tones below about A (27 Hz) on any brass instrument are at the limit of human hearing and become indistinct vibrations.

Due to the necessarily shorter slide, some B♭ instruments with a valve in F cannot always reach the C at full extent, and even on full-length slides the B is unobtainable. These notes are not missing on the modern F contrabass, and its strong pedal register from F downwards accesses the lowest useful range of the double slide contrabass.

Repertoire 

After Wagner's reinvention of the B♭ contrabass trombone for his Ring cycle, it has occasionally been used by other 20th century composers. Strauss wrote for it in his opera Elektra (1908), and Schoenberg in his mammoth Gurre-Lieder (1913), scored for a section of seven trombones including alto and contrabass. French composer D'Indy, inspired by performances of Wagner's Ring, wrote for it in several of his later works, including his last two symphonies. It has also been called for in works by Havergal Brian, Berg, Webern, Varèse, Ligeti, and Boulez. Despite this, the contrabass trombone did not earn a permanent seat in the opera or symphony orchestra.

In the 21st century the contrabass trombone has appeared in orchestral works by Harrison Birtwistle, Sofia Gubaidulina, Hans Werner Henze, and Manfred Trojahn. It has also enjoyed a revival particularly in film and video game soundtracks, due to the influence of Los Angeles session players Phil Teele, Bill Reichenbach, Bob Sanders and others. The contrabass trombone first appeared in film music in Jerry Goldsmith's score for Planet of the Apes (1968), after Phil Teele and the composer agreed to try recording passages with his Miraphone double slide instrument. The popularisation of loud, low-brass heavy orchestral music in films and video games like the remake of Planet of the Apes (2001), Call of Duty (2003) and especially Inception (2010) has made the contrabass trombone nearly ubiquitous, and bass trombonists are now routinely required to double on contrabass for soundtrack session work.

In jazz, it can sometimes be employed to play the fourth (bass) trombone parts in big bands. Maria Schneider has written for it in several of her works, most recently on her 2017 album The Thompson Fields.

Performance 

The double-slide contrabass trombone in B♭ is taxing to play, even with modern instruments. It is unwieldy, being about twice as heavy as a tenor or bass trombone, and its cylindrical bore is less efficient than a similar-pitched tuba, requiring more air to produce good sound. Rapid technical passages are easier to play on the more agile F contrabass, since for much of its range it has a shorter air column and, like the bass trombone, has two valves which enable more alternate positions. Nonetheless, like the tuba, the instrument is better suited as the contrabass voice of harmonic material in an ensemble, rather than virtuoso or solo passages.

The use of a contrabass trombone in an orchestra is usually as an additional fourth player to the standard section of three trombones. In the past, the lack of good instruments, and players able to play them, meant that contrabass trombone parts were often played on a tuba or bass trombone (as can be heard on many 20th century recordings of Wagner, Verdi and Puccini). Nowadays however, it is considered unacceptable to use anything but a contrabass trombone to play them, at least in professional settings. Most opera house orchestras and some symphony orchestras require the bass trombonist to double on the contrabass trombone.

References

Bibliography 

 
 
 
 
 
 
 
 

Contrabass instruments
Bass (sound)
Orchestral instruments
Trombones